Fakhrabad (also Romanized as Fakhrābād; also known as Fakhrābād-e Rāmjerd and Fakhr Abad Ramjerd) is a village in Ramjerd-e Yek Rural District, in the Central District of Marvdasht County, Fars Province, Iran. At the 2006 census, its population was 458, in 99 families.

References 

Populated places in Marvdasht County